West Aurora is an unincorporated community in Miller County, in the U.S. state of Missouri.

West Aurora was platted in 1882, and named for its location west of nearby Aurora Springs.

References

Unincorporated communities in Miller County, Missouri
Unincorporated communities in Missouri